Numb Nuts is an album by the English punk rock band Snuff. It was released in March 2000 on the American independent label Fat Wreck Chords.

Critical reception
Exclaim! deemed the album "16 tracks of driving, witty, horny, organ-tastic mod-punk fun."

Track listing
All songs written by Snuff
"Pixies" – 2:15    
"Yuki" – 2:20    
"SQII" – 2:35    
"Marbles" – 2:28    
"Numb Nuts" – 2:23    
"Reach" – 1:52     
"Another Wet Weekend at the Tundra Theme Park" – 2:21     
"EFL vs. Concrete" – 2:31     
"Fuck Off" – 0:35     
"Chalk Me Down for More" – 1:43     
"It's a Long Way Down" – 2:34     
"Romeo & Juliet" – 2:11     
"Soup of the Day" – 1:46     
"Hilda Ogden and the Thick Plottens" – 2:00     
"Sweet Days" – 1:49     
"Cake" – 0:07

Credits
 Duncan – vocals, drums
 Loz – guitar
 Lee B. – bass
 Lee Murphy – Hammond organ
 Steve Cox – Hammond organ
 Produced by Snuff

References

External links
Fat Wreck Chords album page

2000 albums
Snuff (band) albums
Fat Wreck Chords albums